Toni Häppölä (born April 9, 1981) is a Finnish professional ice hockey forward who most recently played for HPK of the SM-liiga during the 2010-11 season.

References

External links

1981 births
Finnish ice hockey forwards
HPK players
Living people
Ice hockey people from Helsinki